The Dumbbell Nebula (also known as the Apple Core Nebula, Messier 27, and NGC 6853) is a planetary nebula (nebulosity surrounding a white dwarf) in the constellation Vulpecula, at a distance of about 1360 light-years. It was the first such nebula to be discovered, by Charles Messier in 1764. At its brightness of visual magnitude 7.5 and diameter of about 8 arcminutes, it is easily visible in binoculars and is a popular observing target in amateur telescopes.

Shape and size 
The Dumbbell Nebula appears shaped like a prolate spheroid and is viewed from our perspective along the plane of its equator. From this, an upper limit to the age of 14,600 years may be determined.

Structure
Like many nearby planetary nebulae, the Dumbbell contains knots. Its central region is marked by a pattern of dark and bright cusped knots and their associated dark tails (see picture). The knots vary in appearance from symmetric objects with tails to rather irregular tail-less objects. Similarly to the Helix Nebula and the Eskimo Nebula, the heads of the knots have bright cusps which are local photoionization fronts.

Central star
The central star, a white dwarf progenitor, is estimated to have a radius which is  (0.13 light seconds) which gives it a size larger than most other known white dwarfs. Its mass was estimated in 1999 by Napiwotzki to be .

Appearance 

The Dumbbell nebula can be easily seen in binoculars in a dark sky, just above the small constellation of Sagitta.

See also
 Messier object
 List of Messier objects
 List of planetary nebulae
 New General Catalogue

Notes 

Radius = distance × sin(angular size / 2) =  * sin(8′.0 / 2) =  ly
Semi minor axis = distance × sin(minor axis size / 2) =  × sin(5′.6 / 2) =  ly
Kinematic age = semi-minor axis / expansion rate =  ly / 31 km/s =  / 31 km/s =  s =  yr
7.5 apparent magnitude - 5 × (log10( distance) - 1) =  absolute magnitude

References

External links

 SEDS: Messier Object 27
 
 M27 on astro-pics.com
 
 M27
 Dumbbell Nebula (M27) at Constellation Guide

Planetary nebulae
Vulpecula
Messier objects
NGC objects
Orion–Cygnus Arm
17640712